Crame Col is a col at about  near the northern tip of James Ross Island, trending northeast–southwest between the Bibby Point massif and the Lachman Crags. Following geological work by the British Antarctic Survey (BAS), 1981–83, it was named by the UK Antarctic Place-Names Committee after James A. Crame, a BAS geologist from 1976, who worked in the area, 1981–82.

References
 

Mountain passes of Graham Land
Landforms of James Ross Island